"Your Love Is Driving Me Crazy" is a song written and performed by Sammy Hagar from his album Three Lock Box. It provided Hagar with his only top 20 solo hit on the Billboard Hot 100 chart, peaking at number 13 in 1983.  The song reached number 19 in Canada.

"Your Love Is Driving Me Crazy" ranks as the 79th biggest U.S. hit of 1983.

Chart performance

Weekly charts

Year-end charts

References

External links
 

1982 singles
Sammy Hagar songs
Songs written by Sammy Hagar
Song recordings produced by Keith Olsen
1982 songs
Geffen Records singles